Garnet Cooper Bush (August 28, 1882 – December 30, 1919) was an American professional baseball umpire.

References

1882 births
1919 deaths
Major League Baseball umpires
Sportspeople from Missouri